Hanford Dixon (born December 25, 1958) is a former professional American football cornerback who played his entire career (1981–1989) for the Cleveland Browns of the NFL.  Dixon made the Pro Bowl three times, in 1986, 1987 and 1988.  He was drafted by the Browns out of the University of Southern Mississippi with the 22nd pick in the first round of the 1981 NFL Draft. He also is credited with naming the Cleveland Browns "Dawg Pound," the section of the stadium known for their antics during Browns home games at the old Municipal Stadium inspired by Dixon's "barking" to teammates, especially fellow cornerback Frank Minnifield.

Dixon and Minnifield were selected by NFL.com as the No 2 "Best Cornerback Tandem of All-Time." Dixon has been honored many times by his alma mater including being inducted into the M-Club Alumni Association Sports Hall of Fame in 1988 and being named to the school's Football Team of the Century. He became the seventh football member of the school's Legends Club joining Reggie Collier, Brett Favre, Ray Guy, Derrick Nix, Sammy Winder and Fred Cook.

On October 29, 2017, Dixon attended the 4th London International Series Game in London, U.K.

Dixon remains a visible presence on the football front in Cleveland, as he is a football analyst for WOIO-TV 19 (CBS) in Cleveland, and the color analyst for the high school football game of the week on FS Ohio. He has a podcast with former Browns QB Bernie Kosar called "The Bernie Kosar Show with Handford Dixon" on the BIGPLAY Network.

Dixon was the head coach of the Lingerie Football League's Cleveland Crush.

Personal life 
Dixon is married and has two sons Kyle and Hanford Jr, and two daughters Merci and Hanna.

References

External links
 
Hanford Dixon's Real Estate Business Website

American Conference Pro Bowl players
American football cornerbacks
American radio sports announcers
American television sports announcers
Cleveland Browns players
Sportspeople from Mobile, Alabama
Players of American football from Alabama
Southern Miss Golden Eagles football players
1958 births
Living people